Cecilia Ulvsdotter (d. 12 March 1399), was a Swedish noblewoman. 

She was born as the youngest child of Bridget of Sweden and Ulf Gudmarsson. In the legend of Bridget, she was born with the assistance of the Virgin Mary. Because of this, her mother decided her for a holy life and placed her in the Skänninge Abbey as a novice. She was placed in the convent against her will and was freed by her brother Karl Ulvsson. She married either two or three times, first with an unknown man who died of poisoning during the wedding between Haakon VI of Norway and Margaret I of Denmark in 1363. At this occasion, Magnus IV of Sweden was saved from poisoning by Lars Sonesson (d. 1377), who was given Cecilia as a reward against the will of her family. As a widow, she was involved in a law suit about her dowry estate. In 1380, she married riksråd  Bengt Filipsson (d. 1383). Twice widowed, she settled as a guest in Vadstena Abbey, to which she was a substantial donor, and where she died.

References
Cecilia Ulvsdotter, urn:sbl:16523, Svenskt biografiskt lexikon (art av Ernst Nygren.), hämtad 2014-12-30

Further reading
 

14th-century births
Ulvsdotter
Swedish landowners
14th-century women landowners
14th-century Swedish nobility